Peter D. Junger (1933 – November 2006) was a computer law professor and Internet activist, most famous for having fought against the U.S. government's regulations of and export controls on encryption software.

The case, Junger v. Daley (6th Cir. 2000), held that computer source code is protected by the First Amendment. The US government prohibited publication of encryption software on the Internet, arguing that encryption software was a "munition" subject to export controls. Junger filed suit in 1996 challenging the regulations.

Junger also did significant legal theoretical work on the interplay between intellectual property, computer law, and the First Amendment. He defined himself as a "First Amendment absolutist."

Biography
Junger grew up in Wyoming, graduating from Harvard University in 1955 and Harvard Law School in 1958.  From January 1959 to December 1960 he was an enlisted man in the U.S. Army serving in West Germany.  After practicing law from 1961 to 1970, he accepted a faculty position at Case Western Reserve University's School of Law. He retired and was Professor of Law Emeritus in 2001.

Junger was also a practicing Buddhist, president of his local Buddhist Temple from 2003 to 2006.

Peter Junger died in November, 2006, at the age of 73 at his home in Cleveland.  He was survived by his mother, Genevieve Junger (born 1901).

References and notes

External links
 Peter D. Junger's website
 Peter Junger's blog ("Samsara's Blog")

1933 births
2006 deaths
Free speech activists
Internet activists
Computer law scholars
Computer law activists
Cryptography law
Cypherpunks
First Amendment scholars
American legal scholars
Harvard Law School alumni
Case Western Reserve University faculty
Harvard College alumni